Andrew Moore (1752April 14, 1821) was an American lawyer and politician from Lexington, Virginia. Moore studied law under George Wythe and was admitted to the bar in 1774. He rose to the rank of captain in the Continental Army during the American Revolutionary War, seeing action at Saratoga. After the war he was eventually commissioned a major general in the Virginia militia in 1803. He was a delegate to the Virginia convention that ratified the United States Constitution in 1788. He was a member of the Virginia legislature from 1791 to 1789 and from 1799 to 1800. He represented Virginia in both the U.S. House (1789–97, 1804) and the U.S. Senate (1804–1809).

Electoral history

1789; Moore was elected to the U.S. House of Representatives with 84.16% of the vote, defeating Independent George Hancock.
1790; Moore was re-elected unopposed.
1793; Moore was re-elected unopposed.
1795; Moore was re-elected unopposed.

In 1803, Moore initially lost a very close race to Thomas Lewis and Lewis was seated.  But Moore contested the result and in 1804, after Congress determined that several votes were cast - for both candidates - by someone who was unqualified, Moore was declared the winner.

References

External links

Biographic sketch at U.S. Congress website

1752 births
1821 deaths
People from Lexington, Virginia
American militia generals
Continental Army officers from Virginia
Members of the Virginia House of Delegates
Virginia state senators
United States senators from Virginia
Virginia lawyers
Democratic-Republican Party United States senators
Democratic-Republican Party members of the United States House of Representatives from Virginia
18th-century American politicians
18th-century American lawyers
19th-century American politicians
19th-century American lawyers